A water boy is someone who, in many contexts, such as construction and farm crews, or in sports, provides workers or competitors with water.

Waterboy(s) may also refer to:
The Waterboy, a 1998 film starring Adam Sandler
"Waterboy" (song), a traditional folk song performed by Fats Waller, Odetta, John Lee Hooker, and many others, and arranged by Avery Robinson
The Waterboys, a Celtic-rock band formed in 1983
Waterboys (film), a 2001 Japanese comedy by Shinobu Yaguchi
 Water Boys (TV series), a TV series based on the film
Water Boyy, a 2015 Thai film
Water Boyy: The Series, a 2017 Thai television series based on the film